Neocenchrea heidemanni is a species of derbid planthopper in the family Derbidae.

References

Further reading

External links

 

Insects described in 1902
Derbinae